The 2015–16 Southern Combination Football League season was the 91st in the history of the competition (the first since it changed name from the Sussex County Football League), a football league in England. This is also the first season in which all divisions were renamed after league restructuring.

Premier Division

The Premier Division featured 16 clubs which competed in the Sussex County League Division One last season, along with four new clubs:
 A.F.C. Uckfield Town, promoted from the old Division Two
 Horsham, relegated from the Isthmian League
 Wick & Barnham United, promoted from the old Division Two
 Worthing United, promoted from the old Division Two

Six clubs have applied for promotion to Step 4: Eastbourne Town, Horsham, Horsham YMCA, Lancing, Loxwood and Newhaven.

League table

Results table

Division One

Division One featured ten clubs which competed in the Sussex County League Division Two last season, along with seven new clubs.
Clubs relegated from the old Division One:
Crawley Down Gatwick
Ringmer
Selsey
Clubs promoted from the old Division Three:
Langney Wanderers
Sidlesham
Southwick
Plus:
Lingfield, demoted from the Southern Counties East League

Relegation from this division was not implemented for this season.

League table

Results table

Division Two

Division Two featured eight clubs which competed in the Sussex County League Division Three last season, along with eight new clubs.
Clubs demoted from the old Division Two:
Rustington
Westfield
Clubs joined from West Sussex League:
A.F.C. Roffey Club
Alfold
Cowfold
Upper Beeding
Clubs joined from the Mid-Sussex League:
AFC Varndeanians, formerly known as Old Varndeanians
Montpelier Villa

In addition, Burgess Hill & Hurst Albion split and reverted to their original names of Hurstpierpoint (remaining in this league) and Burgess Hill Albion (joining the Mid Sussex League), while Ifield changed its name to Ifield Galaxy.

Promotion and relegation to and from this division was irregular, due to ground grading issues and other league constitution aspects.

League table

References

2015-16
9